Marjorie "Marge" Burns (July 13, 1925 – June 3, 2009) was an American and former collegiate and professional golfer.  A graduate of Woman's College UNC in 1948, Burns went on to win the North Carolina Amateur Championship an unprecedented ten times and won the Teague Award as the outstanding amateur athlete in the Carolinas five times.

References 

American female golfers
Golfers from North Carolina
Sportspeople from Greensboro, North Carolina
1925 births
2009 deaths
University of North Carolina at Greensboro alumni
20th-century American women
21st-century American women